Pallenberg is a surname. Notable people with the surname include:

Anita Pallenberg (1942–2017), German-Italian actress, artist, and model
Max Pallenberg (1877–1934), Austrian singer, actor, and comedian
Rospo Pallenberg (born 1939), American screenwriter and film director